Pablo Villalba Fretes (born 17 March 1987 in General Caballero, Paraguay) is a Paraguayan footballer currently playing for Chaco For Ever.

Teams
  2 de Mayo 2007–2008
  Arsenal de Sarandí 2009–2010
  Los Andes 2010–2011
  Comunicaciones 2012–2014
  Deportivo Español 2014–2015
  Unión Aconquija 2016–2017
  Chaco For Ever 2017–present

References
 
 

1987 births
Living people
Paraguayan footballers
Paraguayan expatriate footballers
Club Atlético Los Andes footballers
Arsenal de Sarandí footballers
2 de Mayo footballers
Argentine Primera División players
Expatriate footballers in Argentina
Association footballers not categorized by position